Alwar Balasubramaniam (born 1971), also known as “Bala,” is an Indian artist works in a variety of mediums such as sculpture, painting and printmaking. His work, ranging in subjects from the body and its material relationship with the world to the shadow of a shadow, has been the subject of international acclaim, and has been featured in museums and exhibitions worldwide.

Career 
Bala was born in Tamil Nadu, India. He earned a BFA from the Government College of Arts, Chennai in 1995. He began his formal training with a focus in printmaking and continued to take courses after his graduation at the Edinburgh Printers Workshop (EPW), the Universität fär angewandte Kunst Wien, Vienna where his early work focused on prints and paintings. His work took a turn after his time at the MacDowell Colony residency in Massachusetts. It was here that he ban working increasingly in sculpture and installation in the early 2000s. He was attracted to its multi-dimensionality and has since gained much recognition as a sculptor.

Bala’s first solo exhibition in the United States took place at Talwar Gallery in New York City in 2002. On display were sculptures cast from his own body, monoprints, and a heat sensitive work that revealed itself only at a certain temperature. Bala’s works begin with a questioning of perception and end with a new understanding of what we previously knew. He handles his strong conceptual groundwork with a playfulness in execution. He has shown his works at Talwar Gallery in New York and New Delhi throughout his career.

Other notable showings include Sk(in) at the Phillips Collection in Washington D.C. For this exhibition, Bala created a massive steel sculpture to sit outside. It is not solid, but composed of delicately welded steel pieces that create an image suggestive of a tree trunk, or the human heart itself. The interior component to the piece engages with the walls in three parts, Wound, Hidden Sight, and Untitled. The works all focus on the reversibility of skin, its position on the exterior of a body or and object yet it points to the interior and depth within. Bala has also been involved with notable group exhibitions such as the 50th Anniversary of the Guggenheim Museum in New York, Contemplating the Void in 2010 and On Line at the Museum of Modern Art in New York in 2010–2011. These highly respected museums invited artists from around the world who were known for their innovation and transformative artworks.

Bala’s works have been exhibited in museums, art festivals, and galleries worldwide, including Mori Art Museum, Japan; Essl Museum, Austria; 1st Singapore Biennale; École des Beaux Arts, Paris, France; National Portrait Gallery, Canberra, Australia; and the 18th Biennale of Sydney, Australia.

Work 

Bala prefers to be known simply as “a person who creates art.” He focuses on what needs to be expressed and the materials best suited to do so, rather than defining himself by a material and creating work accordingly.

Similarly, Bala's work, unlike that of many of his contemporaries, largely eschews references to contemporary social or geographic realities – a fact that many critics cite as the reason for his belated international acclaim, especially in comparison with artists whose "Indianness" appears more overtly in their work. Bala's work, by contrast, is centered on the body and its relationship to the material world, focusing especially on the intangible elements – light, air, shadow – that structure physical experience. Bala’s artwork represents the questions that he asks about himself and the particularities of our world. He asks questions about the subjectivity of our perception, our faith or disbelief in the invisible, and the stance our bodies have in relationship to our selves and our world. His artwork also provides certain understandings of these questions. He plays with our perceptions, our preconceptions and others us a new way of looking at things. In a similar way, many of Bala's works deal with Energy – that invisible yet absolutely fundamental animating force of life. While his earlier works often referred to energy in a visually symbolic manner, eventually energy became more of a latent presence in Bala's work – a force connoted rather than denoted, known only by its effects. The dynamic installations of Energy Field (2009) or Link (2009), for example, physically manifest the presence of forms of energy, even while masking their origin – confusing and teasing the viewer and underscoring the myriad non-visible forces at work in the physical world.

Often using his own body as a basis for his sculptures, Bala engages in a profound, but not humourless, investigation into the metaphysics of selfhood. Many of his sculptural series that have included casts from himself, focusing especially on the skin as the literal and metaphorical boundary that separates the inside from the outside, the seen from the hidden, the self from the exterior world. In an early work, Self in progress (2002), for example, a life-sized seated figure cast from his own body, appears rooted within a wall. The figure is caught midway at this transitional threshold, entering from one side of the wall and emerging from another, with a non-visible head apparently stuck inside the wall. The sculpture seems an audacious pronouncement of the will of man, which grants the ability to saturate matter and makes nothing beyond reach or inert. For a passing moment, there seems to exist a connectedness between all things animate and inanimate; the art and the space it inhabits become one. As the artist once remarked, "We usually seek clarity in details while the entire picture may be blurred. To me life is not about clear moments but seeking clarity in life as a whole.

Selected exhibitions

Solo exhibitions
 2019  Talwar Gallery, Becoming Nature, New York, NY, US
 2018  Talwar Gallery, Liquid Lake Mountain, New Delhi, India
 2016  Talwar Gallery, Rain in the midnight, New York, NY, US
 2015  Talwar Gallery, layers of wind, lines of time, New York, NY, US
 2012  Talwar Gallery, New York, NY, US
 Talwar Gallery, Nothing From My Hands, New Delhi, India
 The Phillips Collection, Sk(in), Washington DC, US
 2009  Talwar Gallery, (In)between, New Delhi, India
 2007  Talwar Gallery, New York, NY, US
 Talwar Gallery, (In)visible, New Delhi, India
 2005  Van Every/Smith Galleries, Unfixed Being, Davidson, North Carolina, US
 2004  Talwar Gallery, Into Thin Air, New York, NY, US
 2002  Fundacio pilar I Joan Miro, Traces, Majoca, Spain
 Talwar Gallery, New York, NY
 2000 Association Mouvement Art Contemporain, Chamalieres, France
 The British Council, New Delhi, Inidia
 1999  Die Kleine Galerie, Vienna, Austria
 Carloz Ionzano Gallery, Cadaques, Spain
 Edinburgh Printmakers Workshop, UK
 1998  Taller Galleria, Cadaques, Spain
 Art Inc., New Delhi, India

Selected group exhibitions
 2019  Arvind Indigo Museum, Alchemy: Explorations in Indigo, Ahmedabad, India
 2018  FRAC Lorraine, You Remind Me of Someone, Metz, France
 2015  The Phillips Collection, Intersections, Washington DC, US
 2014  Seattle Art Museum, City Dwellers, Seattle, Washington, US
 2013  Columbus College of Art and Design, WALL, Columbus, OH, US
 2012  18th Biennale of Sydney, all our relations, Sydney, Australia
 Montclair Art Museum, Look Now, Montclair, NJ, US
 2011  National Portrait Gallery, Beyond the Self, Canberra, Australia, and travel to
 McClelland Gallery and Sculpture Park, Australia,: Anne & Gordon Samstag Museum of Art, University of South Australia
 Museum and Art Gallery of the Northern Territory, Australia
 Kiran Nadar Museum of Art, Time Unfolded, New Delhi, India
 2010  The Museum of Modern Art (MoMA), On Line, New York, NY, US
 Guggenheim Museum, Contemplating the Void, New York, NY, US
 2009  Devi Art Foundation, Poddar Collection, Where in the World, New Delhi, India
 2008  Mori Art Museum, Chalo! India: A New Era of Indian Art, Tokyo Japan and travel to
 National Museum of Contemporary Art, Korea
 Essl Museum, Klosterneurburg, Wien, Austria
 2006  Singapore Biennale, Belief, Singapore
 2005  University of Massachusetts, Transition and Transformation, Amherst, MA, US
 Ecole des Beaux-Arts, Indian Summer, Paris, France
 Talwar Gallery, desi(re), New York, NY, US
 2001 8th International Cairo Biennale, Cairo, Egypt
 Finding the Center at the Margins, Indira Gandhi National Centre for the Arts, New Delhi, India
 6th International Biennale of Drawing and Graphic Arts, Gyor, Hungary
 2000  Aar Paar, Exchange exhibition between India and Pakistan
 International Print Triennial, Cracow, Poland
 3rd International Triennial of Graphic Art, Bitola, Macedonia
 6th International Biennial of Miniature Art, Yugoslavia
 1st Cheju International Prints Art Festival, Korea
 5th Triennial Mondiale D'Estampes Petit Format, Chamalieres, France
 4th Muestra Latino Americana International Miniprint, Argentina
 1999  12th Norwegian International Print Triennial, Norway
 Premio International Biella, Italy
 10th International Exhibition for Small Graphics, Lodz, Poland
 4th British International Miniature Print Exhibition, UK
 1998  1st International Print Triennial, Kanagawa, Japan
 7th International Triennial of Prints and Drawings, Vaasa, Finland
 2nd International Triennial of Graphic Art, Labyrinth, Prague, Czech Republic

Education 
1995 – Bachelor of Fine Arts, Government College of Arts, Madras, India
1998 – EPW (Printmaking) Edinburgh, UK
1999 – Universität fur Angewandte Kunste (Printmaking) Wien, Austria

Awards and grants 
 2008  Featured Speaker at TED Conference, Mysore, India
 Guest Lecturer, Department of Art, Cornell University, Ithaca, NY
 2006  Sanskriti Award, India
 2001  Kunstlerdorf's fellowship, Schoppingen, Germany
 Fundacio pilar I Joan Miro's Award, Spain
 1999  UNESCO – ASCHBERG Bursaries for Artists in Residency at Vienna, Austria
 1998  Residency at the MacDowell Colony, New Hampshire, United States
 Grapheion Review Award in International Print Biennial, Prague, Czech Republic
 1997  The Charles Wallace India Trust Arts Fellowship Award, United Kingdom
 Junior Fellowship from Government of India
 Grand prize in 4th Bharat Bhavan International Print Biennial, Bhopal, India
 The Charles Wallace India Trust Arts Fellowship Award, United Kingdom
 1996  2nd Egyptian International Print Triennial Award, Giza, Egypt
 1995  3rd Sapporo International Print Biennial Sponsor Award, Sapporo, Japan
 Research Grant Award from Lalit Kala Academy, India

Publications available
2009 – (IN)BETWEEN. With an essay by Deepak Talwar, 2009.

2007 – (In)visible. With an essay by Sharmini Pereira, 2007.

2005 – Transition and Transformation. University Gallery, Fine Arts Center, University of Massachusetts. With essays by Loretta Yarlow and Deepak Talwar, 2005.
|}

References

External links 
 Sculpture Magazine, July 2019
Artforum, "Alwar Balasubramaniam," September 2018
 Artforum, "Critics Pick: Alwar Balasubramaniam," May 2016
 Art Asia Pacific, "Layers of Wind, Lines of Time," May 2015
 "A. Balasubramaniam Profile,Interview and Artworks"
TEDIndia, "Alwar Balasubramaniam: Art of substance and absence", September 2010
MoMA, Behind the Scenes: On Line, A. Balasubramaniam
New York Times Review, On Line, MoMA, December 2011
A. Balasubramaniam is represented by Talwar Gallery,
A. Balasubramaniam on artnet
Time Out New Delhi
New York Times – (Desi)re
New York Times Review – May 2002

Artists from Bangalore
Living people
1971 births
Indian contemporary painters
Indian installation artists
Indian contemporary sculptors